MAZ-525 (BelAZ-525 from 1959) was a Soviet heavy truck produced by the Minsk Automobile Plant. Development started in 1949 at the Yaroslavl Automobile Plant Design Bureau as the YaAZ-225. It was planned to install a cab from the YaAZ-200, offset to the left. However, further technical documentation was passed on to MAZ where the design was substantially enhanced.

Appearance
The cab appearance changed slightly during production. On the early models the hood was the same width as the cab, in the later editions, it became much narrower. Initially, a guard was installed on the hood sides for safety while the engine was serviced, but was later removed.

Variants
In 1952, the MAZ-E-525D was developed to work in tandem with a 15m³ D-189 tractor-scraper. In 1964, NAMI developed a similar truck called the DTU-25. In 1959, the MAZ-525 was used as a basis for the MAZ-541 aircraft tug, of which three were built. Also in 1959, the MAZ-525A tractor was developed as part of a road train with the 45-ton BelAZ-5271 semitrailer, but this did not enter production because the engine was not powerful enough.

Production moved
In 1959, production was transferred to the Belarusian Automobile Plant, where the truck was produced until 1965 under the name BelAZ-525.

Use
Operation of machines continued until the early 1970s.

External links 
 MAZ-525 on site "Auto model bureau" (Russian)

Trucks of the Soviet Union
525
Dump trucks